Nidi Yahana Kelabei is a 2011 Sri Lankan Sinhala adult drama film directed by Sudesh Wasantha Peiris and produced by Sunil T. Fernando for Sunil T. Films. It stars Robin Fernando and Nadeeka Gunasekara in lead roles along with Rex Kodippili and Sandun Wijesiri. It is the 1153rd Sri Lankan film in the Sinhala cinema.

Plot

Cast
 Robin Fernando
 Rex Kodippili
 Nadeeka Gunasekara
 Sandun Wijesiri
 Sahan Wijesinghe
 Premadasa Vithanage
 Susantha Chandramali
 Nishani Gamage
 Ranruwan Kumaratunga

Soundtrack

References

2011 films
2010s Sinhala-language films